The Association of Far Western District Champions (AFWDC), is an affiliate organization of the Far Western District Association of Chapters of SPEBSQSA, one of the districts of the Barbershop Harmony Society. Founded in 1980–81, its members are the champions from the district's annual quartet contest, from 1947 to present. AFWDC's primary purpose is to raise funds to subsidize the travel expenses of Far Western District quartets which qualify to compete at the Barbershop Harmony Society's international quartet contest. This is done with the proceeds of two shows produced annually: the Past Champs Show, held the Friday evening of the district's annual convention; and the Go For The Gold Show, held each June.

The idea of a past champions organization was the brainchild of Nick Papageorge, lead of The Occidentals, 1977 FWD Quartet Champions. The AFWDC was named by Dan Jordan, who officially founded the association in 1980. Co-founder is Nick Papageorge. The first meeting took place in 1979 in Bakersfield. The first AFWDC "Late Show" was held in 1980 in Phoenix, AZ. The first Go For The Gold Show was held in 1982 in Los Angeles. The first Scorpionaires chorus performance took place in 1983 in Pasadena (chorus named by Lloyd Steinkamp and the chapter they represent "Blythe, CA" was named by Dan Jordan). The bylaws were drafted by Sam Aramian and Dan Jordan in 1979. The black membership badges were created by Dan Jordan and developed by the then society jeweler in 1979. The first and third president of the AFWDC was Dan Jordan (1979–1984 and 1986–1988) the second president was Don Gubbins (1984–1986). Nick Papageorge became the president in 1988 by vote in absentia due to the death of Dan Jordan's father-in-law. No past champs breakfast was held, and a majority in attendance took a vote.

A complete photographic (private) collection was developed by Dan Jordan.

With help of Jack Hines, Dan and Jack presented a proposal to the FWD board to start a $1.00 per district member fund for international bound competing quartets. This, along with funds raised at the Go For The Gold show would help aide the quartets. This started in 1983.

References

Personal files and papers from Dan Jordan. President from 1979–1984 and 1986–1988.
Live recording from "The Occidentals" announcement of the creation of the Association of Far Western District Champions at the FWD Convention, 1978

Barbershop Harmony Society
Organizations established in 1980
Music organizations based in the United States
1980 establishments in the United States